İyidere District is a district of the Rize Province of Turkey. Its seat is the town of İyidere. Its area is 28 km2, and its population is 8,609 (2021).

Composition
There is one municipality in İyidere District:
 İyidere

There are 7 villages in İyidere District:

 Büyükçiftlikköyü
 Çiftlikköy
 Denizgören
 Kalecik
 Köşklü
 Taşhane
 Yaylacılar

References

Districts of Rize Province